Gert Prokop (born 11 June 1932 in Richtenberg, died 1 March 1994 in Berlin from suicide) was a German writer of science fiction and crime fiction. He spent much of his life in the former East Germany. In crime fiction one of his best known works is "Detective Pinky" about an American boy who dreams of being like Allan Pinkerton and at least one of his crime novels was filmed. His science fiction made use of social criticism and dystopian forms. In 1990 he has won the Deutscher Science Fiction Preis (best short story).

Crime fiction 
Der Tod des Reporters, 1973
Einer muß die Leiche sein, 1976 (filmed 1978, Director: Iris Gusner)
So blond, so schön, so tot, 1994

Books for children 
Der Drache mit den veilchenblauen Augen, 1974
Gute-Nacht-Geschichten für verträumte Kinder, 1975
Der kleine Riese und andere Märchen, Kinderbuch
Die Maus im Fenster, 1980
Detektiv Pinky, 1982 (filmed 2001 as )
Der Hausflug, 1989

Science fiction 
Wer stiehlt schon Unterschenkel? 1977 (aka Der Tod der Unsterblichen, 1984)
Der Samenbankraub, 1983
Die Phrrks, 1988
Das todsichere Ding, 1988
Null minus unendlich, 1990

References

External links 
 German website

German crime fiction writers
German science fiction writers
1932 births
1994 suicides
Suicides in Germany
20th-century German novelists
German male novelists
20th-century German male writers